The 2022–23 Denver Pioneers men's basketball team represented the University of Denver in the 2022–23 NCAA Division I men's basketball season. The Pioneers, led by second-year head coach Jeff Wulbrun, played their home games at Hamilton Gymnasium in Denver, Colorado, as members of the Summit League.

Previous season
The Pioneers finished the 2021–22 season 11–21, 7–11 in Summit League play to finish in a tie for sixth place. They were defeated by North Dakota State in the quarterfinals of the Summit League tournament.

Roster

Schedule and results

|-
!colspan=12 style=""| Regular season

|-
!colspan=9 style=|Summit League tournament

Sources

References

Denver Pioneers men's basketball seasons
Denver Pioneers
Denver Pioneers men's basketball
Denver Pioneers men's basketball